Thyasira trisinuata, common name the "Atlantic cleft clam", is a species of saltwater clam, a marine bivalve mollusc in the family Thyasiridae. This species is found along the Atlantic coast of North America, ranging from Nova Scotia to the West Indies.

References

Thyasiridae
Bivalves described in 1842